Factory was a band from Stockholm in Sweden, active between 1978 and 1982, scoring chart successes in Sweden during the late 1970s and 1980s.

Factory broke through in Sweden with the 1978  single Efter plugget 1978. The single was followed up by the album Factory. The band toured the Nordic Region in the late 1970s and early 1980s and also released the 1980 album Factory II.

After Factory broke up, bassist Siewertson joined the Swedish hair metal band Treat and played on their early albums before leaving in 1989.

During the 1990s, the band was reunited temporary touring with, among others, Magnum Bonum, Attack and Snowstorm.

Members
 Mats Carinder, vocals
 Ted Leinsköld, guitar
 Lars-Olof Larsson, keyboard
 Ken Siewertson, bass
 Mats Söderberg, drums

Discography

Studio albums 
 Factory (1979)
 Factory II (1980)

Compilation albums 
 Best of Factory (1989)

Singles
 Lumpna funderingar (1978)
 Efter plugget (1978)
 Kuddsnack (1979)
 Face to Face (1981)
 Jag ställer inte upp (1981)
 Hårt mot hårt (1982)
 Ooa hela natten (with Attack och Magnum Bonum) (1992)

Maxisingles 12"
 Efter plugget (1989)

References

1978 establishments in Sweden
1982 disestablishments in Sweden
Musical groups established in 1982
Musical groups disestablished in 1982
Musical groups from Stockholm